Celeste and Jesse Forever is a 2012 American romantic comedy-drama film directed by Lee Toland Krieger and written by Rashida Jones and Will McCormack. The movie was released on August 3, 2012, in New York City and Los Angeles, with Rashida Jones and Andy Samberg as the top billed cast.

Plot
Celeste and Jesse start dating in high school and eventually marry young. Their relationship is depicted via photo montage, ending with Celeste walking away from Jesse during a party.

Celeste and Jesse get along well. She is a successful trend analyzer and runs her own media company with a business partner, Scott. Celeste's media company has recently signed Riley Banks, a teenage pop star whom Celeste does not respect and had previously insulted during a television interview. Jesse is an unemployed artist in no hurry to find a job.

Celeste decides to separate but promises to remain friends. Jesse agrees, but he is still in love with Celeste and hopes to reconcile. They manage to share a close relationship after their separation. Their connection during the divorce becomes increasingly concerning to their mutual friends, Beth and Tucker. Beth tries to reason with Celeste and Jesse about the odd nature of their arrangement, but Celeste rationalizes that it is better for the two to maintain their friendship. Another mutual friend, Skillz, agrees with Beth and Tucker and maintains that it is time for the two to move on with their lives.

Celeste is initially content with her relationship status until she spends the night with Jesse. Realizing reconciliation is not possible, Jesse decides to leave while ignoring Celeste's apologies. Jesse is able to move on and begins dating Veronica, who later becomes pregnant. Celeste is unhappy about Veronica’s pregnancy and expresses concern to Beth, who wonders if she is having second thoughts with regard to the divorce. To distract herself, Celeste takes up exercising and begins dating other people. While out with a new boyfriend, Max, Celeste runs into Jesse. The encounter becomes awkward for Celeste, but Max and Jesse get along well. Having gone through a divorce before, Max suggests that Celeste is not ready to date and that she should take her time.

Celeste meets Paul in yoga class and responds angrily after he hits on her. After the two meet again at a party, she warms up to Paul and they begin seeing each other. In the meantime, Jesse begins to mature and takes on more responsibility with regard to Veronica and her pregnancy. Celeste ultimately realizes her decision to divorce Jesse was impulsive and selfish and hopes to reunite with him. When she expresses her feelings to Jesse, they fight and leave each other on poor terms.

Celeste later gets a call from her client, Riley, asking her to come over. Celeste initially believes she is upset because of a logo design that sparked unintentional controversy with her tween fanbase. After arriving at Riley's house, she finds her in tears. She admits to Celeste that she has been seeing a man whom she recently discovered cheating on her. They form an unexpected bond over their shared heartbreak and become friends. At a nightclub with Riley, Celeste realizes the questionable logo she designed appeals greatly to Riley's gay fanbase. Celeste recognizes the potential to leverage the logo to make her the next Lady Gaga.

At Beth and Tucker's wedding, Celeste makes an emotional toast, urging the newlyweds to appreciate each other, be patient, and try hard, as she should have done in her own marriage. This speech touches Jesse and he thanks Celeste.

On a karaoke date, Celeste informs Paul of her need to take some time to recover from her divorce, which he understands. Celeste and Jesse finally sign their divorce papers and are able to laugh at each other's inside jokes. Their lawyers look on, confused by this response. Celeste wishes Jesse well and asks if he loves Veronica, to which he responds that he does. Celeste encourages him to keep fighting for his marriage to Veronica and they share one final kiss.

Cast

Reception

Critical response
Celeste and Jesse Forever was screened at the 2012 Sundance Film Festival in January to mostly positive reviews. Rotten Tomatoes gives the film a "Certified Fresh" rating of 71% based on 141 reviews with an average score of 6.36/10. The site's consensus states, "While it doesn't subvert the genre as incisively as it thinks it does, Celeste and Jesse Forever is a shrewd rom-com that benefits from its likable cast and trumpets the arrival of Rashida Jones as a bona fide big screen talent". Metacritic gives the film a score of 59 out of 100, based on reviews from 37 critics, indicating "mixed or average reviews".

Owen Gleiberman of Entertainment Weekly gave the film an A− and concluded his review by stating: "I will say that it's been a while since a romantic comedy mustered this much charm by looking this much like life". Roger Ebert was also positive in his review for the Chicago Sun-Times, giving it three-and-a-half out of four stars. He credited Jones for writing a "sound" screenplay and characters with a regard for their emotions, while calling the film "a good-hearted romantic comedy about a likable couple — so likable, indeed, that it swims upstream against the current of our desires".

Accolades

Release
Celeste and Jesse Forever was released on DVD and Blu-ray on February 5, 2013.

References

External links
 
 
 

2012 films
2012 independent films
2012 romantic comedy-drama films
American independent films
American romantic comedy-drama films
Films directed by Lee Toland Krieger
Films produced by Suzanne Todd
Films set in Los Angeles
Sony Pictures Classics films
2010s English-language films
2010s American films